Leftoverture is the fourth studio album by American rock band Kansas, released in 1976. The album was reissued in remastered format on CD in 2001. It was the band's first album to be certified by the RIAA, and remains their highest selling album, having been certified 5 times platinum in the United States.

Background 
Steve Walsh began to experience writer's block prior to the recording, and his contribution to the album would ultimately be limited to co-authoring three songs. It fell on Kerry Livgren to fill the void. The new compositions retained much of the classically inspired complexity of Livgren's previous work. Kansas recorded the album at Studio in the Country in Bogalusa, Louisiana. The Studio in the Country was so named because, as Livgren described on In the Studio with Redbeard radio show in the episode spotlighting Leftoverture, "it was in the middle of a swamp. We'd walk out of the studio and there would be gators in front of the studio, mosquitos the size of B-52s and at times armadillos would run into the control room."

Leftoverture opens with the song "Carry On Wayward Son", which Livgren wrote as a sequel to "The Pinnacle", the final song from the previous album Masque (1975).

The album's title, Leftoverture, is a portmanteau of "leftover" and "overture".

Reception 

The album was met with mixed reviews. Rolling Stone called Leftoverture Kansas's best album to date, and said that it "warrants Kansas a spot right alongside Boston and Styx as one of the fresh new American bands who combine hard-driving group instrumentation (with a dearth of flashy solos) with short, tight melody lines and pleasant singing." The magazine Playboy reviewed the album as "extremely strong" and lauded Kansas for representing "the solid, Midwestern values of our vast musical heartland." In contrast, Robert Christgau said the album lacked the intelligence and conviction of European progressive rock, and that the self-deprecating humor implied in the song and album titles is completely absent from the record itself.

More recently, AllMusic's Stephen Thomas Erlewine wrote that the album contains "neither hooks nor true grandiosity to make it interesting" and, despite the great single "Carry On Wayward Son," the fact that Kansas "never manage to rival it anywhere on this record is as much a testament to their crippling ambition as their lack of skills." Gary Graff was more enthusiastic, finding Leftoverture to be "Kansas' breakthrough album and a thorough representation of its assorted musical sensibilities." Ultimate Classic Rock critic Matt Wardlaw considered "Carry On Wayward Son", "Magnum Opus", "The Wall", "What's on My Mind" and "Opus Insert" to be classics.  Ultimate Classic Rock critic Eduardo Rivadavia rated "The Wall" as Kansas' 6th greatest song, saying it addresses the same theme that Pink Floyd addressed in their rock opera The Wall but accomplishes it in less than 5 minutes.  Rivadavia also says of "The Wall" that it "exhibited the vast scope of the band's orchestral vision and melodic gifts like no other Kansas song before it.  Rivadavia also rated "Carry On Wayword Son" as Kansas' greatest song.

Classic Rock History critic Brian Kachejian rated "The Wall" as Kansas' all-time best song, as well as rating "Carry On Wayward Son" number 2 and "Miracles Out of Nowhere" number 5.  Classic Rock critic Dave Ling also ranked 3 songs from Leftoverture among Kansas' 10 best – "Magnum Opus", "Miracles Out of Nowhere" and "Carry On Wayward Son".

Daily Republican-Register critic Jim Marshall said in his contemporary review of Leftoverture that "The Wall" was "one of the best songs I have ever heard in my whole life." St. Louis Post-Dispatch critic John S. Cullinane said that "The Wall" is "the prettiest and the simplest" song on side 1 and said that Walsh's lead vocal is "flawless."  I Love Classic Rock rated "The Wall" as one of Kansas' 10 best love songs, describing it as a "harmonic power ballad" and a "five-minute upbeat, feel-good track."

Track listing

Personnel 
Kansas
 Steve Walsh – organ, piano, additional synthesizers, vibraphone, lead and backing vocals
 Kerry Livgren – electric guitar, piano, clavinet, Moog, Oberheim and ARP synthesizers
 Robby Steinhardt – violin, viola, lead vocals on "Miracles Out of Nowhere" and "Cheyenne Anthem", backing vocals
 Rich Williams – electric and acoustic guitars
 Dave Hope – bass guitar
 Phil Ehart – drums, percussion

Additional personnel
 Toye LaRocca, Cheryl Norman – children's voices on "Cheyenne Anthem"

Production
Jeff Glixman – producer, assistant engineer, remastered edition producer
Bill Evans – engineer
Edwin Hobgood, Ray Black – additional studio assistance
George Marino – mastering at Sterling Sound, New York City, New York
Jeff Magid – remastered edition producer

Charts 
 

Album

Singles

Certifications

References 

Kansas (band) albums
1976 albums
Albums produced by Jeff Glixman
Legacy Recordings albums
Epic Records albums
Albums recorded at Studio in the Country